Lucksta is a locality situated in Sundsvall Municipality, Västernorrland County, Sweden with 346 inhabitants in 2010.

Sports
The following sports clubs are located in Lucksta:

 Lucksta IF

References 

Populated places in Sundsvall Municipality
Medelpad